The 2008 Netball Superleague Grand Final featured Galleria Mavericks and Loughborough Lightning. Having played in both the 2006 and 2007 grand finals, this was Mavericks' third successive grand final appearance. It proved third time lucky for Mavericks who defeated Lightning 43–39.

Lightning were leading 21–14 at half time thanks to an outstanding shooting performance from 19-year-old Joanne Harten. However Mavericks, inspired by Louisa Brownfield and Karen Atkinson, subsequently began to create more shooting opportunities.  Mavericks defence – Amanda Newton, Clare Elsley and Naomi Siddall – also played a vital part in a second half fight back. By the end of the third quarter, Mavericks had reduced Lightning's lead to 28–31. During the final quarter Mavericks drew level at 34–34, before pulling ahead by six goals thanks to clinical finishing from Brownfield and Michelle Hall. Harten scored four goals to help keep Lightning in touch before three goals from Brownfield secured the title for Mavericks.

Route to the Final

Match summary

Teams

References

2007–08 Netball Superleague season
2006-07
Loughborough Lightning netball matches
Mavericks Netball matches
Netball Superleague